Turning Point UK (TPUK) is a British offshoot of Turning Point USA set up to promote right-wing politics in UK schools, colleges and universities, ostensibly to counter what Turning Point alleges are the left-wing politics of UK educational institutions. The group reportedly has links to the far-right, including conspiracy theorists such as InfoWars.  The group has a closely similar rhetoric to Generation Identity, whose intentions are racist and Islamophobic.

The group describes its objectives as promoting "the values of free markets, limited government and personal responsibility". It says it does this to counter what it alleges is "a dogmatic Left-wing political climate, education system and radical Labour Party" which, Turning Point UK claims, "sympathises with terrorists [and] wishes to disarm the nation".

The group was launched in December 2018 by Charlie Kirk, founder of Turning Point USA, and Candace Owens, then the communications director of the US group, at the Royal Automobile Club in London. On the day of its social media launch in February 2019, Tory MPs including Jacob Rees-Mogg and Priti Patel tweeted supportive messages for the group. Labour MP David Lammy observed that the launch and its Tory support are evidence that the Conservative Party "openly promotes hard-right, xenophobic bile".

From its inception, the organisation and its leading members were the subject of widespread popular ridicule. It was described by the BBC as "a tsunami of online mockery".

Overview
Turning Point UK's chairman was George Farmer until April 2019, and its CEO was Ollie Anisfeld until 2021 (the son of Lance Forman, former Brexit Party MEP for London). The group employs several staff.

The Chief Operating Officer until November 2021 was Jack Ross, who also co-directs Reasoned with right wing activist Darren Grimes. in 2021, Nick Tenconi took over as COO.

According to the Oxford University newspaper Cherwell, the group "claims to already have chapters at eight universities". The group's then chairman George Farmer told the paper they had chapters at the universities of Sussex, Oxford, St Andrews, York, Warwick, Nottingham, King's College London, University College London, the London School of Economics and the University of the Arts London. Like Turning Point USA, it does not disclose the identities of its donors.

The group was launched in December 2018 by Charlie Kirk, the founder of Turning Point USA, and Candace Owens, then the communications director of the US group, at the Royal Automobile Club in London. Among those attending the event were Andy Wigmore, Paul Joseph Watson, and James Delingpole. On the day of its social media launch in February 2019, MPs including Jacob Rees-Mogg and Priti Patel tweeted supportive messages for the organisation, as did Nigel Farage while it was marked for criticism by others. From its inception, the organisation and its leading members were the subject of widespread popular ridicule on the social networking service Twitter. The ridicule continued for at least a week. It was described by the BBC as "a tsunami of online mockery". The launch of its Twitter account was accompanied by multiple parody accounts, along with a parody of the organisation's website created by a 'left-leaning student' calling himself 'Skeptical Seventh'. There was also a protest from the charity Turning Point over potential confusion caused by similarities between the two names.

Labour MP David Lammy described Turning Point UK as evidence that "sinister forces are taking hold of our country" and that the Conservative Party "openly promotes hard-right, xenophobic bile". The scholar Chris Allen has said that while the group is linked to the far-right Turning Point USA, the UK group did not fit traditional conceptions of the far-right. Allen notes the group's closely similar rhetoric and demographic to Generation Identity, whose intentions are racist and Islamophobic.

Dominique Samuels, one of the group's "Young Influencers", told the BBC during a radio interview that the UK branch would not set up the same controversial Professor Watchlist for which its US counterpart is known. The group hosts the TPUK Education Watch website, where students can submit examples of political bias in the education system.  The site has been described by the University and College Union as having "the acrid whiff of McCarthyism about it" after it called for videos and photos of lecturers to be sent into it for publication. Turning Point UK rejected the accusation and said that any academic they featured would be given the right to reply and that unlike the US group the default would not be to name people although they reserved the right to do so.

References 

Conservative political advocacy groups in the United Kingdom
Student wings of political parties in the United Kingdom
2019 establishments in the United Kingdom